Caresana is a comune (municipality) in the Province of Vercelli in the Italian region Piedmont, located about  northeast of Turin and about  southeast of Vercelli.

Caresana borders the following municipalities: Langosco, Motta de' Conti, Pezzana, Rosasco, Stroppiana, Villanova Monferrato.

Demographic evolution

External links

References

Cities and towns in Piedmont